The Central Water and Power Research Station (CWPRS) Pune is the major research organisation in the field of hydraulic and allied research as a subordinate office of the Department of Water Resources, River Development and Ganga Rejuvenation, Ministry of Jal Shakti, Government of India and deals with planning, organising and undertaking specific research and development studies related to optimising designs of river, coastal, water storage and conveyance hydraulic structures.

References

External links 
 

Water supply and sanitation in India
Ministry of Water Resources (India)